Thoropa petropolitana is a species of frog in the family Cycloramphidae. It is endemic to Serra dos Órgãos in the state of Rio de Janeiro, Brazil; there are also unconfirmed records from the neighboring Espírito Santo and São Paulo states.

Habitat and conservation
Thoropa petropolitana occurs at elevations above  in rocky areas in forest, or on the forest edge, where it lives on wet rock faces near streams or waterfalls. The eggs are deposited in rock fissures. This formerly common species has undergone significant declines. Threats to it include habitat loss caused by clear-cutting, human settlement, tourism, and fire. However, it has also declined in areas with suitable habitat, suggesting that chytridiomycosis might be a factor. This species occurs in the Serra dos Órgãos National Park, but the park does not protect it from impacts of tourism.

References

petropolitana
Amphibians of Brazil
Endemic fauna of Brazil
Amphibians described in 1907
Taxonomy articles created by Polbot